Guillermo E. Brown (aka Pegasus Warning) is a multi-disciplinary performer whose works include Soul at the Hands of the Machine, The Beat Kids' Open Rhythm System and Sound Magazine, Black Dreams 1.0, ...Is Arturo Klauft, Handeheld, Shuffle Mode, WOOF TICKET EP, PwEP2, forthcoming full-length album Dream&Destroy and performance piece Bee Boy. His one-man theater piece, Robeson in Space, premiered at Luna Stage (2005).   
 
Additional work includes sound installation cracked unicorns at The Studio Museum in Harlem, performance pieces Postcolonial Bacchanale (Harlem Stage), SYRUP (The Kitchen), supergroup BiLLLL$, the collaborative trio Thiefs, and sound installation for She Talks to Beethoven by Adrienne Kennedy directed by Charlotte Brathwaite at JACK NYC.

Biography
A graduate of Wesleyan University (B.A.) and Bard College (M.F.A.), Brown was adjunct professor at New York University's Clive Davis Institute of Recorded Music and Gallatin School from 2006 to 2008 and Artist-in-Residence at Pacific Northwest College of Art in 2010. He is a recipient of a 2016 Creative Capital Award in Performing Arts for Bee Boy, a recipient of Harvestworks New Works Residency (2001) and Van Lier Fellowship (2002), and a residency at MIT's Center for Art, Science, and Technology (2016-2017). 
 
Most recently he appears as the drummer in the house band (called Melissa) of The Late Late Show with James Corden on CBS, with band leader Reggie Watts.  In addition he is featured on over 45 recordings, and has appeared live, recorded and as drummer/vocalist/collaborator with Vijay Iyer, Mike Ladd, David S. Ware, William Parker, Matthew Shipp, Rob Reddy, Roy Campbell, Spring Heel Jack, Anti-Pop Consortium, Anthony Braxton, DJ Spooky, El-P, Carl Hancock Rux, Vernon Reid, DJ Logic, Latasha Diggs, Dave Burrell, George E. Lewis, Mendi & Keith Obadike, Victor Gama, David Gunn, Arto Lindsay, Gordon Voidwell, Tecla, Jahcoozi, Robot Koch, Das Racist, Jamie Lidell, Saul Williams, CANT, Mocky, Twin Shadow, Busdriver, Grisha Coleman, and Wangechi Mutu among others.

Discography
 Pegasus Warning, Woof Ticket EP, (Plug Research), 2013
 Thiefs' full-length LP, drums/voice, (Melanine Harmonique), 2013
 Mocky's Graveyard Novelas, voice, (Heavy Sheet), 2013
 Vijay Iyer/Mike Ladd/Maurice Decaul's Holding It Down: The Veterans' Dreams Project, (Pi Recordings), 2013
 Tecla's We Are The Lucky Ones, co-producer, (Mayimba Music), 2013
 Lucky Paul, Demonspawn, voice, (somethinksounds), 2011
 CANT, Dreams Come True, (Terrible/Warp), 2011
 Andrew Lamb, Rhapsody in Black, (NoBusiness Records), 2011
 Jahcoozi's, Barefoot Wanderer, voice, (Bpitch Control), 2010
 Das Racist's "Don Dada" from Shut Up, Dude, composer/producer, (Michka/Greedhead), 2010
 William Parker, I Plan to Stay a Believer, (Aum Fidelity), 2010
 Shuffle Mode, (Melanine Harmonique later licensed to Cleveland Tapes), 2009
 David S. Ware Quartet, Live in Vilnius, (NoBusiness), 2009
 Guillermo E. Brown/Matthew Shipp Duo, Telephone Popcorn, (Nu Bop Records), 2008
 Crosstalk: American Speech Music, curated by Mendi + Keith Obadike (Bridge Music), 2008
 David S. Ware Quartet, Renunciation, (Aum Fidelity), 2007
 Vijay Iyer + Mike Ladd, Still Life with Commentator, (Savoy Jazz), 2007
 Colorform, Fragments of Youth, (Bonanzagram), 2007 
 George Lewis, SEQUEL, (INTAKT), 2006
 Dave Burrell's DB3, Momentum, (High Two Records), 2006
 David S. Ware, BalladWare, (Thirsty Ear), 2006
 Guillermo E. Brown, Handeheld, (Melanine Harmonique Records), 2005 
 Guillermo E. Brown, ...is Arturo Klauft, (Melanine Harmonique Records), 2005 
 Mike Ladd's Negrophilia, (Thirsty Ear), 2005
 David S. Ware, Live in the World, (Thirsty Ear), 2005
 Guillermo E. Brown's Black Dreams 1.0, (Melanine Harmonique Records), 2004
 El-P, High Water, (Thirsty Ear), 2004
 Matthew Shipp Trio, The Trio Plays Ware, (Splasc(H)), 2004
 DJ Spooky, celestial mechanix, (Thirsty Ear), 2004
 Creative Trans-Informational Alliance, Atrospect Sound 1: An Opera in Four Acts, (CTIA), 2004
 Guillermo E. Brown's The Beat Kids, Open Rhythm System, (7H/Uncle Junior ), 2003
 Antipop Consortium, Antipop vs. Matthew Shipp, (Thirsty Ear), 2003
 David S. Ware String Ensemble, Threads, (Thirsty Ear), 2003
 The Little Huey Creative Music Orchestra, Spontaneous, (Splasc(H)), 2003
 DJ Wally, Nothing Stays the Same, (Thirsty Ear), 2003
 DJ Spooky, Dubtometry, (Thirsty Ear), 2003
 Guillermo E. Brown's Soul at the Hands of the Machine], (Thirsty Ear), 2002
 DJ Spooky's Optometry, (Thirsty Ear), 2002
 Matthew Shipp's Nu Bop, (Thirsty Ear), 2002
 David S. Ware, Freedom Suite, (Aum Fidelity), 2002
 Rob Reddy's Honor System, Seeing by the Light of My Own Candle, (Knitting Factory), 2001
 Spring Heel Jack, Masses, (Thirsty Ear), 2001
 Roy Campbell, It's Krunch Time, (Thirsty Ear), 2001
 David S. Ware, Corridors & Parallels, (Aum Fidelity), 2001
 William Parker and The Little Huey Creative Music Orchestra,  The Raincoat in the River Vol. 1, (Eremite), 2001
 David S. Ware, Surrendered, (Sony/Columbia), 2000

Education
M.F.A., Music/Sound, The Milton Avery Graduate School of the Arts at Bard College, Annandale-on-Hudson, NY, 2005
B.A., Music, Wesleyan University, Middletown, CT, 1998

Residencies
 Office Hours, The Kennedy Center's REACH, 2022, Washington, DC
 FORM Arcosanti, 2019, Arcosanti, Arizona
 Artist-in-Residence, Pacific Northwest College of Art, 2010, Portland, Oregon
 Future Places Festival, 2009, Porto, Portugal
 Sant'Anna Arresi Jazz Workshop, 2004, Sardinia, Italy
 Van Lier Residency, Harvestworks, 2002–2003, New York City
 Artist Fellowship Harvestworks, 2000–2001, New York City

References

Avant-garde jazz musicians
Living people
The Late Late Show with James Corden
Thirsty Ear Recordings artists
Pi Recordings artists
Knitting Factory Records artists
AUM Fidelity artists
1976 births